Živojin is a Serbian masculine given name of Slavic origin. It may refer to:

Živojin Bumbaširević (1920–2008), orthopaedic surgeon and traumatologist
Živojin Juškić (born 1969), Serbian footballer
Živojin Milovanović (1884–1905), soldier
Živojin Mišić (1855–1921), Serbian military commander
Živojin Pavlović (1933–1998), film director and writer
Živojin Tamburić (born 1957), Serbian comics critic, historian, editor and publisher
Živojin Zdravković (1914–2001), conductor

See also
Živojinović

Slavic masculine given names
Serbian masculine given names